is a Japanese former footballer who last played for YSCC Yokohama.

Career
Nakanishi retired at the end of the 2019 season.

Club statistics
Updated to 23 February 2020.

References

External links

Profile at YSCC Yokohama

1991 births
Living people
Nippon Sport Science University alumni
Association football people from Hyōgo Prefecture
Japanese footballers
J3 League players
YSCC Yokohama players
Association football defenders